Aviation management is a study discipline responsible for coordinating operations at an Airport and airline management or other business in the airline industry. Professionals in this discipline specialize in various field, such as flight logistics, aircraft maintenance, customer service and marketing for the airline.

References

Aviation
Aviation education
Aviation industry